The Murray State Racers women's basketball program represents intercollegiate women's basketball representing Murray State University. The school competes in the Missouri Valley Conference in Division I of the National Collegiate Athletic Association (NCAA).

History
Murray State began play in 1928. From 1932 to 1970, the women's team was discontinued; the Racers began play again in 1971. They have made the postseason four times, once in the NCAA Tournament (2008), three in the WNIT (1989, 2007, 2009). In their only NCAA appearance, they lost 78–59 to Duke. As of the end of the 2016–17 season, the Racers have an all-time record of 576–746–2.

NCAA tournament results

References

External links